The 2016–17 season was Dunfermline Athletic's first season in the Scottish Championship, having finished top of the Scottish League One in 2015–16. The Pars were relegated from the competition's previous incarnation, the Scottish First Division at the end of the 2012–13 season.

Manager Allan Johnston made four permanent first-team summer signings as he began his second season as Dunfermline Athletic manager. The club's first competitive fixtures came in the revamped Scottish League Cup, where they were eliminated at the group stage after finishing in third place. Dunfermline Athletic also competed in the Challenge Cup and the Scottish Cup, where they were knocked out by Dundee United and Hamilton Academical respectively.

Season review

May
16 May 2016: Manager Allan Johnston makes his first signing of the summer transfer window by recruiting former Cowdenbeath and Inverness Caledonian Thistle midfielder Nat Wedderburn on a one-year deal.
25 May 2016: Former Kilmarnock defender Lee Ashcroft becomes Dunfermline's second signing of the summer, following his release by the Rugby Park side. Ashcroft previously played under Allan Johnston whilst the latter was in charge of Kilmarnock.
27 May 2016: The draw for the Scottish League Cup takes place, with the new format seeing the club drawn in Group C alongside Inverness Caledonian Thistle, Dundee United, Arbroath and Fife rivals Cowdenbeath, with matches due to be played between the 19th and 31 July.
31 May 2016: It was confirmed that five first-team players were released after their contracts with the club had expired. Amongst those released were Shaun Byrne who had been with the Pars since 2008, and former captain Josh Falkingham.

June
3 June 2016: Managing Director Ross McArthur was appointed as the new chairman of Dunfermline, replacing Bob Garmory who had led the club following the acquisition by the fan-led group 'Pars United' in  October 2013. Bill Braisby also took up the role vice-chairman.
8 June 2016: Having overseen the success of the club's social media profile, 29-year old Michael Mlotkiewicz was made general manager of the club .
13 June 2016: Former Queen of the South striker Gavin Reilly joined on a season-long loan from Heart of Midlothian. Reilly previously worked under manager Allan Johnston whilst both were at the Doonhammers.
17 June 2016: It was revealed that Dunfermline's first game in the Scottish Championship would be against Dumbarton, as the SPFL announced the league fixtures for the 2016–17 season. The club's first Fife derby with Raith Rovers would be at Stark's Park on 20 August 2016, with the final match of the season being away to Queen of the South.

July
8 July 2016: The club bring in former Dundee United youth player Euan Spark on a one-year deal, after the defender impressed as a trialist in 3 friendlies, scoring in the Pars first friendly of the season against Partick Thistle.
9 July 2016: Dunfermline's first match at East End Park saw them defeat an under-strength Hearts side 3–1, with goals from Andy Geggan and Joe Cardle seeing off the team from Gorgie.
15 July 2016: The side was confirmed as having come top of the fair play table for the previous season, with their only red card being rescinded after it was judged that Joe Cardle had not struck Ayr United defender Peter Murphy as referee Andrew Dallas had initially perceived.
18 July 2016: Kallum Higginbotham becomes the Pars sixth signing of the summer, as the former Partick Thistle and Kilmarnock winger joins on a one-year contract. Manager Allan Johnston expressed his delight signing, stating that he had admired Higginbotham "for a long time".
31 July 2016: The Pars' 2016 Scottish League Cup campaign comes to an end after defeat to fellow Championship side Dundee United by two goals to nil left the side in third place, four points behind the Tannadice club.

August
6 August 2016: The opening day of the Scottish Championship saw the Pars defeat Dumbarton 4–3 at East End Park, with Joe Cardle scoring the first hat-trick of the 2016–17 season. After leading 4–1, the last three minutes of the match saw Dumbarton awarded two penalties, with summer signing Lee Ashcroft being sent off after bringing down former-Par Robert Thomson in the box.
18 August 2016: The draw for the third round of the Scottish Challenge Cup takes place at The Kelpies in Falkirk, with former Pars manager Jim Jefferies drawing the home teams. Dunfermline are drawn against Scottish League One club Brechin City, with the tie to be played at Glebe Park on the weekend of 3 September 2016.
20 August 2016: The first league derby match with Raith Rovers in over 3 years sees the Kirkcaldy side finish 2–0 winners, with goals from Bobby Barr and Mark Stewart in the final 20 minutes giving the Rovers the win.
23 August 2016: Under 20s defender Stuart Morrison becomes the first Pars player since Lewis Martin in 2014 to be selected for international duty, with the 17-year old being called up by Scot Gemmill for the Scotland U19 side. for two friendly matches with Greece. Also in the squad is former Pars youth player PJ Crossan, who was bought by Celtic during the 2016 summer transfer window.
31 August 2016: Former Queen of the South and Rangers Striker Nicky Clark signs from Bury a two-year deal on transfer deadline day. Clark, who previously worked with manager Allan Johnston at Queen of the South, is also the son of current assistant manager Sandy Clark, who he also worked with at the Dumfries side.

September
1 September 2016: Allan Johnston makes his third loan signing of the season and his seventh first-team signing in total, bringing former Celtic midfielder John Herron on a short-term loan from Football League Two club Blackpool.
3 September 2016: The Pars run out 5–1 winner against Scottish League One side Brechin City at Glebe Park in the third round of the Scottish Challenge Cup. Goals from Paul McMullan, Gavin Reilly, Lee Ashcroft, as well as an own goal from Dougie Hill secure the win for Dunfermline, with Ally Love firing in a consolation goal for City.
5 September 2016: After a trial period with the club, Dunfermline make former Falkirk and Hibernian striker Farid El Alagui their eighth and final signing of the summer transfer window, with the French Moroccan joining on a four-month deal until January 2017.
10 September 2016: The first visit of Dundee United to East End Park in almost five years saw the Pars lose 1–3 to the Tannadice club. The match received a great deal of attention, after United goalkeeper Cammy Bell saved three penalties in the space of 24 minutes, from three different penalty takers, with Bell subsequently being awarded the match ball for his hat-trick of saves.

October
8 October  2016: The side progress to the quarter-finals of the Challenge Cup, defeating Scottish League One club Queen's Park 2–1 at East End Park. Farid El Alagui put the Pars 2–0, before scoring an own-goal in the 70th minute, completing an unlikely hat-trick.
16 October 2016: Former Par George Peebles died at a nursing home in Stirling, aged 80. Peebles, who spent 11 years with Dunfermline Athletic between 1955 and 1966, made over 300 appearances for the club and helped the Pars to win the 1960–61 Scottish Cup.
18 October 2016: French Moroccan striker Farid El Alagui wins the Irn-Bru Cup Golden Balls Award after his unconventional hat-trick against Queen's Park in the fourth round of the Scottish Challenge Cup.

November
12 November 2016: The Pars exited the Scottish Challenge Cup at the quarter-finals, after a 0–1 defeat to Dundee United at East End Park. Terrors defender Mark Durnan scored the only goal of the match in the 8th minute, with Dunfermline defender Lewis Martin receiving a straight red card after referee Willie Collum judged him to have pulled back United player Blair Spittal.
26 November 2016: Dunfermline faced Highland League side Buckie Thistle for the first time since 1980, defeating the Victoria Park club 3–5. Goals from Michael Paton, Kallum Higginbotham, Paul McMullan as well as an own goal from Jags defender Hamish Munro cancelled out goals from Buckie players John McLeod and Chris Angus.
25 November 2016: Jim Gillespie, who spent five years with Dunfermline between 1969 and 1974, died at the age of 69.

December
3 December 2016: Dunfermline's poor penalty record continued after Kallum Higginbotham had two late spot kicks saved by Ayr United goalkeeper Greg Fleming.
16 December 2016: Club director Margaret Ross died at the age of 65. Ross, who was the first chair of the Pars Supporters Trust (PST), was a key participant in the club's survival after entering into administration in 2013, with Ross leading fundraising through the fan-group Pars United.
31 December 2016: Former Aberdeen centre back Callum Morris returned to the club, having previously left to join Dundee United in June 2014. Morris signed a six-month deal, keeping him at East End Park until at least the end of the season.

January
7 January 2017: Former club director Margaret Ross, who died in December 2016, is named 'Fan of the Year' by the Scottish Football Supporters Association.
16 January 2017: Drew Main is appointed as a director on the club's board, after being elected as PST chair following the passing of Margaret Ross. Main was previously spent four years as Vice-Chair of the PST.
21 January 2017: The Pars progress to the Fifth round of the Scottish Cup after defeating Scottish League One club Alloa Athletic 3–2 at the Indodrill Stadium. Goals from Nicky Clark, Paul McMullan and Joe Cardle gave the Pars the victory as Callum Morris made his first start after returning to the club in December.
22 January 2017: After defeating Alloa, Dunfermline were drawn at home in the next round of the Scottish Cup to play Scottish Premiership side Hamilton Academical, with the tie to be played on the weekend of 11 February 2017.

March
4 March 2017: Nicky Clark became the first Pars player in over 22 years to score four goals in a league match, with the side defeating Dumbarton 5–1 at East End Park. Northern Irish striker George O'Boyle previously scored four against Clyde in a 5–0 league win in May 1994, whilst in the Scottish Cup, Andy Smith netted five times in a 7–2 defeat of Edinburgh City in January 1998.

Squad list

Results & fixtures

Pre-season

Scottish Championship

Scottish League Cup

Table

Matches

Scottish Challenge Cup

Scottish Cup

Squad statistics

Starting XI

Captains

Appearances and goals
During the 2016–17 season, Dunfermline used twenty-seven different players in competitive matches. The table below shows the number of appearances and goals scored by each player. Centre-back Lee Ashcroft has made the most appearances, playing forty-six out of a possible 47 games, with Nicky Clark leading the scoring with sixteen goals in all competitions.

|-
|colspan="14"|Players away from the club on loan:

|-
|colspan="14"|Players who appeared for Dunfermline Athletic but left during the season:

|}

Clean sheets
Dunfermline have used two goalkeepers in all competitions during the 2016–17 season. The table below shows the total number of shutouts made, with 12 clean sheets having been kept in all competitions after 47 matches.
{| class="wikitable" style="font-size: 95%; text-align: center;"
|-
!width=15|
!width=15|
!width=15|
!width=150|Name
!width=80|Total
!width=80|Scottish Championship
!width=80|Scottish Cup
!width=80|Scottish League Cup
!width=80|Scottish Challenge Cup
|-
|1
|GK
|
|Sean Murdoch
|10
|10
|
|
|
|-
|43
|GK
|
|David Hutton
|2
|
|
|2
|
|-
|
|
|
! Totals !! 12 !! 10 !! 0 !! 2 !! 0

Goalscorers
During the 2016–17 season, sixteen Dunfermline players scored 70 goals in all competitions, with 3 goals having been own goals scored by Brechin City defender Dougie Hill, St Mirren captain Andy Webster and Buckie Thistle defender Hamish Munro. Striker Nicky Clark was the club's top scorer, with 16 goals in 47 competitive matches. Two players scored hat-tricks, with both coming against Dumbarton; Joe Cardle scored three on the opening day of the season, whilst Nicky Clark scored four in the 5–1 victory over the Sons in March 2017.

Disciplinary record

Club statistics

League table

Results by round

Results summary

Home attendances

{| class="wikitable sortable" style="text-align:center; font-size:90%"
|-
! scope="col" width=100 | Comp
! scope="col" width=120 | Date
! scope="col" width=60  | Score
! scope="col" width=250 class="unsortable" | Opponent
! scope="col" width=150 | Attendance
|-
|League Cup||19 July 2016||bgcolor="#CCFFCC"| 3–0 ||Arbroath||1,974
|-
|League Cup||26 July 2016||bgcolor="#FFCCCC"| 1–5 ||Inverness Caledonian Thistle||2,580
|-
|Championship||6 August 2016||bgcolor="#CCFFCC"| 4–3 ||Dumbarton||3,496
|-
|Championship||27 August 2016||bgcolor="#FFCCCC"| 0–1 ||Queen of the South||3,973
|-
|Championship||10 September 2016||bgcolor="#FFCCCC"| 1–3 ||Dundee United||5,563
|-
|Championship||24 September 2016||bgcolor="#CCFFCC"| 4–3 ||St Mirren||2,732
|-
|Challenge Cup||8 October 2016||bgcolor="#CCFFCC"| 2–1 ||Queen's Park||1,930
|-
|Championship||22 October 2016||bgcolor="#FFCCCC"| 1–3 ||Hibernian||7,622
|-
|Championship||5 November 2016||bgcolor="#FFFFCC"| 0–0 ||Raith Rovers||5,649
|-
|Challenge Cup||12 November 2016||bgcolor="#FFCCCC"| 0–1 ||Dundee United||2,576
|-
|Championship||10 December 2016||bgcolor="#CCFFCC"| 2–1 ||Greenock Morton||3,250
|-
|Championship||26 December 2016||bgcolor="#FFFFCC"| 1–1 ||Falkirk||6,134
|-
|Championship||14 January 2017||bgcolor="#FFFFCC"| 1–1 ||St Mirren||4,108
|-
|Championship||28 January 2017||bgcolor="#FFFFCC"| 1–1 ||Dundee United||4,670
|-
|Scottish Cup||11 February 2017||bgcolor="#FFFFCC"| 1–1 ||Hamilton Academical||2,945
|-
|Championship||4 March 2017||bgcolor="#CCFFCC"| 5–1 ||Dumbarton||3,496
|-
|Championship||7 March 2017||bgcolor="#FFFFCC"| 1–1 ||Queen of the South||2,653
|-
|Championship||18 March 2016||bgcolor="#FFCCCC"| 0–1 ||Ayr United||3,276
|-
|Championship||1 April 2017||bgcolor="#FFFFCC"| 1–1 ||Hibernian||7,058
|-
|Championship||8 April 2017||bgcolor="#CCFFCC"| 1–0 ||Raith Rovers||4,865
|-
|Championship||22 April 2017||bgcolor="#FFCCCC"| 1–2 ||Falkirk||5,076
|-
|Championship||29 April 2017||bgcolor="#CCFFCC"| 3—1 ||Greenock Morton||3,339
|-
|bgcolor="#C0C0C0"|
|bgcolor="#C0C0C0"|
|bgcolor="#C0C0C0"|
| Average league attendance:
| 4,438
|-
|bgcolor="#C0C0C0"|
|bgcolor="#C0C0C0"|
|bgcolor="#C0C0C0"|
| Total league attendance:
| 79,885
|-
|bgcolor="#C0C0C0"|
|bgcolor="#C0C0C0"|
|bgcolor="#C0C0C0"|
| Average total attendance:
| 3,995
|-
|bgcolor="#C0C0C0"|
|bgcolor="#C0C0C0"|
|bgcolor="#C0C0C0"|
| Total attendance:
| 91,890

Awards

Club

Transfers

First team

Players in

Players out

Loans in

Loans out

Development squad

Players in

Players out

Contract extensions

First team

Development squad

Notes

References

Dunfermline Athletic F.C. seasons
Dunfermline Athletic